NDSL can refer to:

 Nintendo DS Lite, a 2006 handheld video game console
 Naked DSL, style of broadband connection
 National Defense Student Loan